The Glomacze, also Golomacze or Dolomici ( or Gołomacze) - were Polabian Slavs inhabiting areas in the middle Elbe (Łaba) valley. Other West Slavic tribes such as the Milceni settled east of them. About 850 the Bavarian Geographer located a Talaminzi (Dala-Daleminzi) settlement area east of the Sorbs. According to later chronicler Thietmar of Merseburg, the people called themselves Glomacze after a central cult site, a now dry lake near the present-day town of Lommatzsch. 

The first known account about the Glomacze is from 805 when they were raided by the troops of Frankish king Charles the Younger on his way to Bohemia. The actual conquest of the tribe started in early 929 by the German king Henry the Fowler who, as Widukind of Corvey reported, seized and destroyed their main castle called Gana at the siege of Gana (probably located near present-day Stauchitz), exterminated the defenders and had a fortress erected on the hill of Meissen (Mišno). Their settlement area was incorporated into the large Saxon Marca Geronis and in 965 became part of the Margraviate of Meissen.

Citations

Bibliography
 

Polabian Slavs
9th century in East Francia
10th century in East Francia